5296 is Kobukuro's 7th album released under Warner Music Japan, released on December 19, 2007.

Track listing
 Aoku Yasashiku (蒼く 優しく)
 Coin (コイン)
 Tsubomi (蕾)
 Donna Sora demo (どんな空でも)
 Kimi to Iu Na no Tsubasa (君という名の翼)
 White Days
 Kimiiro (君色)
 Suimen no Chō (水面の蝶)
 Kaze no Naka o (風の中を)
 Gekkō (月光)
 Kazamidori (風見鶏)
 Diary
 Fragile Mind

Release history

References

External links
 Kobukuro Official Discography Web Site
 Oricon Music Special
 HMV Album Release

2007 albums
Kobukuro albums
Warner Music Japan albums